Cherrybrook railway station is a station on the Sydney Metro network's North West Line, located along Castle Hill Road in the suburb of Cherrybrook, New South Wales. The station is planned to eventually serve trains to the Sydney central business district and Bankstown as part of the government's 20-year Sydney's Rail Future strategy.

History 

The NSW Government announced a future railway line through the Cherrybrook area, from Epping to Castle Hill, as part of its Action for Public Transport strategy in 1998. (The document did not specifically list any intermediate stations, however.) A more specific but longer-term plan presented by Co-ordinator General of Rail Ron Christie three years later listed possible stations at Koala Park, West Pennant Hills, and Highs Road, also in West Pennant Hills.

In 2002, Transport Minister Carl Scully announced the notional Koala Park and Highs Road sites would be served by a single station at Franklin Road, Cherrybrook, to be called Franklin Road. This site faces Castle Hill Road, like its predecessors, and is roughly  halfway between the two. Franklin Road Station remained part of successive north-western rail proposals, including the Metropolitan Rail Expansion Strategy in 2005 and a short-lived metro proposal in 2008.

Following a change of government, work on the Sydney Metro Northwest commenced in 2013. The station was renamed Cherrybrook Station (Government Land) in the final proposal. The new station opened 26 May 2019. The station is operated by Metro Trains Sydney, which was also responsible for the design of the station as part of its Operations, Trains and Systems contract with Transport for NSW.

Services

Cherrybrook has one island platform with two faces. It is served by Metro North West Line services. Cherrybrook station is served by a number of bus routes operated by Hillsbus.

References

External links
 Cherrybrook Station description at Sydney Metro Northwest project website
 Northwest Rapid Transit corporate website
 Cherrybrook Station details Transport for New South Wales  (Archived 18 June 2019)

Easy Access railway stations in Sydney
Railway stations in Australia opened in 2019
Sydney Metro stations
Hornsby Shire